Værøy Church is a parish church of the Church of Norway in Værøy Municipality in Nordland county, Norway. It is located in the village of Sørland on the south side of the island of Værøya. It is the church for the Værøy parish which is part of the Bodø domprosti (deanery) in the Diocese of Sør-Hålogaland. The white, stone church was built in a long church style in 1939 using plans drawn up by the architect Harald Sund. The church seats about 313 people.

History
The Old Værøy Church was the only church on the island from the late 1700s onwards. In the 1930s, a new church was planned. Since the majority of the population lived in Sørland, the new church was built there. The old church is still used once a month for worship services.

See also
List of churches in Sør-Hålogaland

References

Værøy
Churches in Nordland
Stone churches in Norway
20th-century Church of Norway church buildings
Churches completed in 1939
1939 establishments in Norway
Long churches in Norway